A civet is small, mostly arboreal mammal native to the tropics of Africa and Asia.  

The term may also refer to:
 Civet (perfumery), extracted from perineal glands of the civet
 Civet (band), a punk rock band from Long Beach, California
 CIVETS, an acronym for the nations Colombia, Indonesia, Vietnam, Egypt, Turkey, and South Africa
 Jugged food stewed in an upright container (such as Jugged Hare, known as civet de lièvre in France)